Synthia is the third studio album by Australian indie rock band The Jezabels. It was self-released on 12 February 2016 and internationally through Dine Alone Records.

Track listing
All tracks written by Hayley Mary, Heather Shannon, Sam Lockwood, and Nik Kaloper.

Personnel
Synthia album personnel adapted from CD liner notes.

The Jezabels
 Hayley Mary – vocals
 Heather Shannon – keyboards
 Nik Kaloper – drums
 Samuel Lockwood – guitar
Additional personnel
 Lachlan Mitchell – engineer, producer
 Peter Katis – mixing at Tarquin Studios
 Greg Calbi – mastering at Sterling Sound
 Christopher Doyle & Co. – art direction, design
 Pierre Toussaint – photography

Charts

References

2016 albums
Dine Alone Records albums
The Jezabels albums